The Vogelkop bowerbird (Amblyornis inornata), also known as the Vogelkop gardener bowerbird, is a medium-sized, bowerbird of the mountains of West Papua (New Guinea).

Description
The birds are about 21–35 cm in length, with the females being slightly smaller.  They are mainly olive brown in colour, though somewhat paler below, without ornamental plumage. This makes the species one of the dullest-coloured members of the bowerbird family with, however, one of the largest and most elaborate bowers.

Bower
The bower is a cone-shaped hut-like structure some 100 cm high and 160 cm in diameter, with an entrance usually propped up by two column-like sticks.  A front "lawn" of some square meters area is cleaned of debris and laid out with moss.  On this, and in the entrance of the bower, decorations such as colourful flowers or fruit, shining beetle elytra, dead leaves and other conspicuous objects are collected and artistically arranged.

Males go to great lengths to ensure that their displays are in prime condition, replacing old items as needed, as well as trying to outdo their neighbours by finding more spectacular decorations, and arranging them appropriately.  As opposed to other species of bowerbirds, such as the satin bowerbird, there is no fixed preference for items of a certain colour, more important being the "novelty value" of the items instead, which can lead to fashion-like trends if males find rare or unusual items; such rare finds are prime targets for theft by neighboring males. Females visit bowers and, depending on whether they like the "treasure trove" on display, will mate with the attendant males. The bower, indeed the male, play no part in nesting and raising the young.

The songs and mimicry skill of this bird are well known among the indigenous peoples. In September 1872, Odoardo Beccari became the first naturalist to see the home grounds of this bowerbird in the Arfak Mountains of Irian Jaya.

Because of its unadorned and plain plumage, this bowerbird is relatively safe from persecution. A common species within its limited habitat range, the Vogelkop bowerbird is evaluated as Least Concern on the IUCN Red List of Threatened Species.

References

External links
 Avian Visual Cognition: Photo of male arranging red flowers and black beetle elytra. Retrieved 2007-FEB-19.
 BirdLife Species Factsheet. Retrieved 2007-FEB-19.
 Photo of male in front of bower by Don Roberson. Note discarded batteries and film casings. Retrieved 2007-FEB-19.
 Video of a Vogelkop Bowerbird preparing its display
 Video footage from the BBC's Life and Life of Birds series

Vogelkop bowerbird
Birds of West Papua
Vogelkop bowerbird